Peter Kane was a boxer.

Peter Kane may also refer to:

Peter Kane (footballer) (born 1939), Scottish former footballer
Peter Kane (magician) (1938–2004), British magician

See also
Peter Cain (disambiguation)
Peter Du Cane (disambiguation)